Konary  is a village in the administrative district of Gmina Przeworno, within Strzelin County, Lower Silesian Voivodeship, in south-western Poland. Prior to 1945 it was in Germany and the name of the village was then Kunern and it belonged to the family von Gaffron.

See also
Konary Castle

References

Villages in Strzelin County